This is a list of Colombian football transfers for the 2015 season. Moves featuring Categoría Primera A and Categoría Primera B clubs are listed.

Transfers

Note: All players, and clubs without a flag are Colombian.

References

Soccerway.com - Águilas Doradas transfers
Soccerway.com - Alianza Petrolera transfers
Soccerway.com - Atlético Huila transfers
Soccerway.com - Atlético Nacional transfers
Soccerway.com - Boyacá Chicó transfers
Soccerway.com - Cortuluá transfers
Soccerway.com - Cúcuta Deportivo transfers
Soccerway.com - Deportes Tolima transfers
Soccerway.com - Deportivo Cali transfers
Soccerway.com - Deportivo Pasto transfers
Soccerway.com - Envigado transfers
Soccerway.com - Jaguares de Córdoba transfers
Soccerway.com - Junior transfers
Soccerway.com - La Equidad transfers
Soccerway.com - Medellín transfers
Soccerway.com - Millonarios transfers
Soccerway.com - Once Caldas transfers
Soccerway.com - Patriotas transfers
Soccerway.com - Santa Fe transfers
Soccerway.com - Uniautónoma transfers

Transfers 2015
Colombian